Hugh Doherty (born 21 March 1940) is an Australian modern pentathlete. He competed at the 1960 Summer Olympics.

References

1940 births
Living people
Australian male modern pentathletes
Olympic modern pentathletes of Australia
Modern pentathletes at the 1960 Summer Olympics
Sportspeople from Melbourne